The 1921 Washington Senators season was their inaugural and only season in the league. The team finished 1–2, finishing in twelfth place in the league.

Schedule

 Games in italics are against non-NFL teams.

Standings

References

Washington Senators (NFL) seasons
Washington Senators (NFL)
Washington Senators (NFL)